In Romano-British culture and Germanic polytheism, the Alaisiagae  (possibly "dispatching terrors" or "all-victorious") were a quartet of Celtic and Germanic goddesses deifying victory.

Centres of worship
The Alaisiagae were Celtic deities and Germanic deities who were worshipped in Roman Britain, altar-stones raised to them having been recovered in the United Kingdom at Vercovicium (Housesteads Roman Fort) at Hadrian's Wall in England.

Another centre of worship was perhaps the town of Bitburg, near the German-Belgian border, which was called “Beda Vicus,” which although Latin derives from the Celtic "Village of Beda.".

Votive inscriptions

First inscription 
One of the votive inscriptions to these goddesses reads:
 DEO MARTI THINCSO ET DVABVS ALAISAGIS BEDE ET FIMMILENE ET N AVG GERM CIVES TVIHANTI VSLM
 "To the god Mars Thincsus and the two Alaisagae, Beda and Fimmilena, and the divine spirit of the emperor, the German tribesmen from Tuihantis willingly and deservedly fulfill their vow."

Mars Thincsus is correlated with the Germanic war-god Týr. The latter was associated with oath-taking and the Thing, a local assembly of free men. Political issues were discussed, judicial decisions were made, and religious rites were held there. Scherer suggests that they came from the district of Twenthe (hence, the mention to "cives Tvihantis") in the province of Overijssel, Netherlands.

Second inscription 
The second inscription reads:

 DEABVS ALAISIAGIS BAVDIHILLIE ET FRIAGABI ET N(umini) AVG(usti) N(umerus) HNAVDIFRIDI V(otum) S(olvit) L(ibens) M(erito)

Syncretism
The goddesses called the Alaisiagae are named on altar-stones found in shrines along Hadrian's Wall: Beda, Baudihille, Fimmilena, and Friagabis. These Celtic goddesses had parallels with similarly named Frisian goddesses who may have arrived on Germanic soil via Gaulic France. These goddesses are not known to be Roman. Beda may have been an abbreviation for Ricagambeda since the two names share similar semantics. The Romanized Celtic soldiers who served along Hadrian’s Wall more than likely introduced the Alaisiagae to their Roman counterparts, thus spreading worship of these goddesses of victory.

Archeological setting
The altar stones of the Alaisiagae were recovered in the Temple of Mars at Vercovicium. This roughly circular temple was found on top of Chapel Hill a little to the south of the fort, its walls of undressed stone facing with an earth and rubble infill enclosed an area measuring about 17¼ ft. across. The insubstantial foundations indicate that the superstructure was at least half-timbered.

The temple was built in the early-3rd century upon the ruins of a rectangular workshop in the vicus which had been destroyed during the barbarian incursions of AD196. It contained altars dedicated by the commanders and men of all three units known to be stationed at Vercovicium to the god Mars Thincsus, the Romanized aspect of a Teutonic god, a common occurrence among the Roman auxiliary units. Various altars have been found at this site dedicated to Mars and/or to the Celto-Germanic goddesses Alaisiagae; named on one altar as Beda and Fimmilena, on another as Baudihille (Boudihillia) and Friagabis.

Etymology
Boudihillia can be derived from the Proto-Celtic *Bōud-ī-hīlījā  meaning 'victory's fullness.'
Beda is derived from the Proto-Celtic *Bed-ā meaning 'burial.'
 Alaisiagae is derived from the Proto-Celtic *Ad-lājsījā-agai meaning (in the illative) 'sending fears,' plausibly a byword for a notion of “dispatching terrors” (q.v.   ).

Sources
British Museum, London, England.
Carlisle Museum, Cumbria, England.
Lancaster museum, Lancaster, England.
Newcastle Museum of Antiquities, Newcastle upon Tyne, England.
Penrith Museum, Penrith, England.
Vercovicium Roman Museum, Housesteads, Northumberland, England.
York Castle Museum, York, England.

References

Goddesses of the ancient Britons
Celtic goddesses
Germanic goddesses
Death goddesses
War goddesses
Germanic deities